Lévignac (also known as Lévignac-sur-Save) is a commune in the Haute-Garonne department in southwestern France.

Population
The inhabitants are known as Lévignacais in French.

Transportation
Lévignac lies on the Itinéraire à Grand Gabarit, the route created specially for the oversized road conveys conveying fuselage and wing sections of the Airbus A380 airliner to Toulouse for final assembly. The convoys, which run overnight at up to weekly frequency, travel down the main street of the town, with only centimetres clearance from the adjacent buildings. Major works on the main street were required to permit this, including new pedestrian paths, parking areas and lighting.

See also
Communes of the Haute-Garonne department

References

Communes of Haute-Garonne